William Russell Lane-Joynt (27 March 1855– 6 June 1921), born in Limerick, was an Irish barrister, philatelist and Olympic shooter. He founded the Irish Philatelic Society in Dublin and assisted the Duke of Leinster to form his collection which was bequeathed to the Dublin Museum of Science and Art. Lane-Joynt was one of only two Irish philatelists to be honoured by signing the Roll of Distinguished Philatelists.

Life
He was the son of William Lane-Joynt, Mayor of Limerick (1862) and Lord Mayor of Dublin (1867). He had four brothers and a sister. One of his brothers was the surgeon and radiologist, Richard Lane Joynt. Educated at Windermere College, Wales, Lane-Joynt graduated with a B.A. and M.B. from Trinity College, Dublin in 1878. After attending King's Inns, Dublin, he was called to the bar as a barrister-at-law in April 1879. He married in 1882 and had two children, Evelyn and William (b.24 August 1886).
 
Lane-Joynt was Revolver Champion of Ireland four times and won a silver medal for shooting at the 1908 Summer Olympics, held in London, as a member of the Men's Running Target, Single Shot Great Britain team. He also competed in three other events but did not feature in the medals.

Philately
Amongst Lane-Joynt's philatelic specialities were the line-engraved stamps of the British West Indies, Canada, Cape of Good Hope, Gold Coast, Great Britain, and United States. He became a fellow of the Royal Philatelic Society London in 1889. He was founder member and first president of the Irish Philatelic Club, later renamed the Irish Philatelic Society, at its inception in 1901 and remained its president until 1920. He helped the Duke of Leinster assemble his Leinster Collection, and after the Duke's death he became Honorary Curator of the collection that was bequeathed to the Dublin Museum of Science and Art. In 1921 he was invited to sign the Roll of Distinguished Philatelists as one of the initial 25 candidates but was unable to do so due to ill health. He remains only one of two Irishmen invited to sign the roll.

At the time of his death in 1921, a portion of his collection was on display at the Dublin Museum of Science and Art. He bequeathed that to the museum to be added to the Duke of Leinster's collection, which added to the collection's interest. The balance of his collection was sold at auction in London in January 1922 and later auctions.

References

External links
 National Museum's ‘Duke of Leinster’ bequest
 Philatelic Record biography

1855 births
1921 deaths
Irish philatelists
British male sport shooters
Olympic shooters of Great Britain
Olympic silver medallists for Great Britain
Shooters at the 1908 Summer Olympics
Sportspeople from Limerick (city)
Alumni of Trinity College Dublin
Irish barristers
Olympic medalists in shooting
Fellows of the Royal Philatelic Society London
Medalists at the 1908 Summer Olympics
Signatories to the Roll of Distinguished Philatelists
Alumni of King's Inns